Susan "Sue" Schellinck (born November 10, 1970) is a former field hockey player from Canada, who was born as Susan Reid. She represented her native country at the 1992 Summer Olympics in Barcelona, Spain, where she ended up in seventh place with the Canadian National Team. Schellinck was inducted into the Sport Hall of Fame at Nanaimo District Secondary School.

External links
 
 Canadian Olympic Committee

1970 births
Living people
Canadian female field hockey players
Field hockey people from British Columbia
Field hockey players at the 1992 Summer Olympics
Field hockey players at the 1995 Pan American Games
Olympic field hockey players of Canada
Pan American Games bronze medalists for Canada
Pan American Games medalists in field hockey
Medalists at the 1995 Pan American Games